A Delta Scuti variable (sometimes termed dwarf cepheid when the V-band amplitude is larger than 0.3 mag.) is a subclass of young pulsating star. 
These variables as well as classical cepheids are important standard candles and have been used to establish the distance to the Large Magellanic Cloud, globular clusters, open clusters, and the Galactic Center. The variables follow a period-luminosity relation in certain passbands like other standard candles such as Cepheids.  SX Phoenicis variables are generally considered to be a subclass of Delta Scuti variables that contain old stars, and can be found in globular clusters.  SX Phe variables also follow a period-luminosity relation.  One last sub-class are the pre-main sequence (PMS) Delta Scuti variables.

The OGLE and MACHO surveys have detected nearly 3000 Delta Scuti variables in the Large Magellanic Cloud. Typical brightness fluctuations are from 0.003 to 0.9 magnitudes in V over a period of a few hours, although the amplitude and period of the fluctuations can vary greatly.  The stars are usually A0 to F5 type giant or main sequence stars. The high-amplitude Delta Scuti variables are also called AI Velorum stars, after the prototype AI Velorum.

Delta Scuti stars exhibit both radial and non-radial luminosity pulsations. Non-radial pulsations are when some parts of the surface move inwards and some outward at the same time. Radial pulsations are a special case, where the star expands and contracts around its equilibrium state by altering the radius to maintain its spherical shape. The variations are due to the swelling and shrinking of the star through the Eddington Valve or Kappa-mechanism. The stars have a helium rich atmosphere. As helium is heated it becomes more ionised, which is more opaque.  So at the dimmest part in the cycle the star has highly ionised opaque helium in its atmosphere blocking part of the light from escaping. The energy from this “blocked light” causes the helium to heat up, expand, ionise, become more transparent and therefore allow more light through. As more light is let through the star appears brighter and, with the expansion, the helium begins to cool down. Hence the helium contracts and heats up again and the cyclical process continues.  Throughout their lifetime Delta Scuti stars exhibit pulsation when they are situated on the classical Cepheid instability strip. They then move across from the main sequence into the giant branch.

The prototype of these sorts of variable stars is Delta Scuti (δ Sct), which exhibits brightness fluctuations from +4.60 to +4.79 in apparent magnitude with a period of 4.65 hours.  Other well known Delta Scuti variables include Altair, Denebola (β Leonis) and β Cassiopeiae. Vega (α Lyrae) is a suspected Delta Scuti variable,  but this remains unconfirmed.

Examples

Other examples include - σ Octantis and β Cassiopeiae

References

Further reading
Samus N.N., Durlevich O.V., et al. Combined General Catalog of Variable Stars (GCVS4.2, 2004 Ed.)
AI Velorum star at The Encyclopedia of Astrobiology, Astronomy, and Spaceflight
 AAVSO: Delta Scuti and the Delta Scuti variables

Cepheid variables